Ambrose is a city in Coffee County, Georgia, United States. As of the 2020 census, the city had a population of 327.

Geography
Ambrose is located at  (31.594015, -83.015819).

Demographics

As of the census of 2000, there were 320 people, 129 households, and 74 families residing in the city. The racial makeup of the city was 54.06% White, 25.00% African American, 1.56% Native American, 15.62% from other races, and 3.75% from two or more races. Hispanic or Latino of any race were 25.62% of the population.

There were 129 households, out of which 29.5% had children under the age of 18 living with them, 42.6% were married couples living together, 10.9% had a female householder with no husband present, and 41.9% were non-families. 32.6% of all households were made up of individuals, and 11.6% had someone living alone who was 65 years of age or older.  The average household size was 2.48 and the average family size was 3.19.

In the city, the population was spread out, with 26.3% under the age of 18, 11.9% from 18 to 24, 28.4% from 25 to 44, 23.8% from 45 to 64, and 9.7% who were 65 years of age or older.  The median age was 32 years. For every 100 females, there were 96.3 males.  For every 100 females age 18 and over, there were 100.0 males.

The median income for a household in the city was $22,206, and the median income for a family was $26,250. Males had a median income of $21,000 versus $20,000 for females. The per capita income for the city was $11,684.  About 16.7% of families and 23.3% of the population were below the poverty line, including 29.6% of those under age 18 and 43.8% of those age 65 or over.

References

Cities in Georgia (U.S. state)
Cities in Coffee County, Georgia